Arthur Engelbert (born 1951 Werdohl, West Germany) is a professor in media theory and art sciences at the University of Applied Sciences Potsdam.

Selected works 
 Coincidentia. Zehn Versuche zur zeitgenössischen Kunst, München: Edition Metzel 2018
 Idiorrhythmie: Vorschläge für ein anderes Lernen, Baden-Baden: Nomos Verlag 2017
 Realität und Fiktion. realtà e finzione. Die Welt des Nino Indaimo. Il mondo di Nino Indaimo, Marburg: Tectum Verlag 2017
 Politik und Bild. Eine Langzeitstudie zu Wahrnehmungsumbrüchen innerhalb der letzten dreieinhalb Jahrzehnte, Marburg: Tectum Verlag 2016
 Notes on Urban Kibbutz, Mutual Aid and Social Erotism. Social Imagination for a Collective Society, Marburg: Tectum Verlag 2016
 Die Treppe. Eine kulturgeschichtliche und medienkritische Studie, anhand ausgewählter Beispiele aus verschiedenen Medien, mit einem Glossar, Würzburg: Königshausen & Neumann 2014
 Help! Gegenseitig behindern oder helfen. Eine politische Skizze zur Wahrnehmung heute. Würzburg: Königshausen & Neumann 2012
 Global Images. Eine Studie zur Praxis der Bilder. Mit einem Glossar zu Bildbegriffen. transcript Verlag, Bielefeld Januar 2011
 Der Hörraum. Akustische Experimente und Perspektiven des Klangraums in den letzten fünfzig Jahren. Südwestdeutscher Verlag für Hochschulschriften 2009
 Gegenseitige Hilfe, Marburg: Tectum Verlag 2010
 Normalkultur. Kulturen im Dialog. Würzburg: Königshausen & Neumann 2008
 cultrans. Ansichts-Sachen der Kunst – Views of Art. Königshausen & Neumann 2005, Engelbert, Arthur (Hg.) / Pagel, Maike (Hg.) / Borchers, Wolf (Hg.)
 Das Glashaus von Bruno Taut – Bauen im Licht. Built In The Light, eine CD-ROM der mib GmbH, Vertrieb durch den Verlag der Buchhandlung Walther König, Berlin 1996, Engelbert, Arthur (Hg.) / Ramershoven, Markus (Hg.) / Thiekötter, Angelika Hg.
 Conrad von Soest. Ein Dortmunder Maler um 1400, Köln: Verlag der Buchhandlung Walther König, 1995, sold out.

External links 
 Website of Arthur Engelbert

1951 births
Living people
Academic staff of Fachhochschule Potsdam